Tomay Amay Mile is a Bengali television drama on Star Jalsha. It ran from 11 March 2013 to 21 March 2016 and starred Ditipriya Roy, Riju Biswas, Roosha Chatterjee and Gourab Roy Chowdhury. The show was official remake of Star Plus's popular show Diya Aur Baati Hum.

Plot 
The story centers upon a 20-year-old college student, Ushoshi Mitra, whose dream is to become an Indian Police Service officer, and Nishith Ghosh a sweetshop owner and sweetmaker.

Nishith and Ushoshi get married under strained circumstances. Ushoshi struggles with her strict mother-in-law who does not accept that her daughter-in-law could become a police officer. The story shows how Ushoshi's husband becomes her strength and helps her to fulfil her dreams.

Cast 
Ditipriya Roy (Season 1) (ep 1-2)/ Roosha Chatterjee (ep-2) as Ushoshi Ghosh (née Mitra) — an IPS officer, Nishith's wife, Sujan and Chitra's daughter, Bhavani and Gobindo's daughter in-law
 Riju Biswas / Gourab Roy Chowdhury as Nishith Ghosh — a sweet seller, Ushoshi's husband, Bhavani and Gobindo's son
 Tulika Basu as Bhavani Ghosh
 Titas Bhowmik as Kakoli Ghosh
 Prantik Banerjee as Shyamal Ghosh
 Biplab Banerjee as Gobindo Ghosh
 Chhanda Chatterjee as Katyayani Ghosh
 Indrajit Deb as Kakoli's father
 Sharmila Das as Phul Bou
 Priya Mondal as Diana Ghosh
 Debraj Mukherjee as Babaji / Bishnu Haldar / Shiv Bhakta / Naresh Kumar
 Dolon Roy as Abha Sundari / Fake Taroni (Naresh and Palash’s mother)
 Prince Ghosh as Debal Ghosh
 Tanuka Chatterjee as Taroni 
 Sutirtha Saha as Surya Mitra
 Mallika Majumdar as Madhura Sen
 Debdut Ghosh as Late Sujan Mitra (Deceased) 
 Chaiti Ghoshal as Late Chitra Mitra (Deceased) 
 Aditya Roy as Palash
 Manoj Ojha as Aslam Chowdhury
 Deerghoi Paul as Sohini
 Tirtha Mallick as Siddhartha 
 Unknown as Pritha Mitra-Bitan's wife,Ushashi's sister-in-law
 Sohel Dutta as Bitan (junior)
 Sukdeep Ghosh as Murolidhar Das / Muroli / Arindam Sanyal
 Debjani Deb / Sananda Basak / Ayesha Bhattacharya / Anaya Ghosh as Soma Ghosh (S9)
 Runa Bandopadhyay as Ushoshi's Principal
 Upanita Banerjee as Eli
 Meghna Mukherjee as Kabita
 Arnab Banerjee as Bitan Mitra
 Sohom Basu Roy Chowdhury as Chotu

References

External links

Tomay Amay Mile on Disney+ Hotstar

2013 Indian television series debuts
2016 Indian television series endings
Star Jalsha original programming